A 250 Years Old Person is a book by  Ali Khamenei, Supreme Leader of the Islamic Republic of Iran. It is a collection of his lectures on the  political combats and struggles of Shia Imams. This book consists of 17 chapters.

Author

Ali Khamenei is the Supreme Leader of the Islamic Republic of Iran since 1989 after serving as president from 1981 until 1988. He was born in April 1939 in Mashhad, Iran. He studied Islamic courses at Qom under the dominant Shia Islam Marja' and scholars such as Ruhollah Khomeini, founder of the Iranian Revolution.

Content
A 250 Years Old Person is the collection of lectures and writings of the Ali Khamenei. It consists of 17 chapters. It starts with the life of Mohammad and ends with Hasan al-Askari, 11th Imam of Shia. The first three chapters are about the social and political situation of the Islamic Community,  from the Day of Ashura to the spiritual leadership of Ja'far al-Sadiq. The main concepts of the book are the lifestyle of Imams and their aims in life. The period of 250 years is applied to the tenth lunar Hijri year (631 CE) until the Minor Occultation (874 CE).
According to this book, Mohammad the prophet and the twelve Imams apparently had various methodologies in their lifestyles, but in whole they tried to reach one aim.

Translation
According to the Tasnim News Agency, Ahl Al-Bayt World Assembly stated that the text has been published for the second time in the United States. It has also been translated into French and Swahili.
In March 2015, the book was translated into Urdu in Karachi by "Khana Farhang Iran".

See also

 Ahl al-Bayt
 Early social changes under Islam
 To the Youth in Europe and North America (Letter)
 Letter4u (twitter hashtag)
 Khamenei's fatwa against nuclear weapon
 Palestine (2011 book)
 Islamic Government: Governance of the Jurist
 Tahrir al-Wasilah
 The Unveiling of Secrets
 Works of Seyyed Ali Khamenei
 Ruhe-Tawhid, Nafye Obudiate GheireKhoda (book)

References

External links
 Full text of the book

Iranian books
Ali Khamenei
2014 non-fiction books
Shia Islam